Anna-Maja Kristina Henriksson (née Forss; born 7 January 1964) is a Swedish-speaking Finnish politician. She has served as Finland's Minister of Justice, in Jyrki Katainen's cabinet and Alexander Stubb's cabinet from 2011 to 2015, Antti Rinne's cabinet from June to December 2019 and currently in Sanna Marin's cabinet since December 2019. 

She has been a member of the Parliament of Finland since 2007, vice-chairperson of the Swedish People's Party of Finland 2010–2016 and chairperson of the Swedish Parliamentary Group 2015–2016.

On 12 June 2016, Henriksson was elected as the leader of the Swedish People's Party of Finland becoming the first female leader for the party. She was re-elected as the party's chair in May 2021 without facing any opposition.

Henriksson is married to Janne Henriksson since 1991. The couple has two children.

Awards and honours
 Commander of the Order of the White Rose of Finland (Finland, 2015)

References

|-

|-

|-

1964 births
Living people
People from Jakobstad
Swedish-speaking Finns
Swedish People's Party of Finland politicians
Ministers of Justice of Finland
Members of the Parliament of Finland (2007–11)
Members of the Parliament of Finland (2011–15)
Members of the Parliament of Finland (2015–19)
Members of the Parliament of Finland (2019–23)
Order of the White Rose of Finland
Women government ministers of Finland
21st-century Finnish women politicians
Female justice ministers
Women members of the Parliament of Finland